The 1971–72 season was Blackpool F.C.'s 64th season (61st consecutive) in the Football League. They competed in the 22-team Division Two, then the second tier of English football, finishing sixth.

Blackpool's defence of the Anglo-Italian Cup ended in the final against A.S. Roma at the Stadio Olimpico in Rome. The home side won 3–1.

Micky Burns was the club's top scorer for the second consecutive season, with twenty goals (seventeen in the league and three in the League Cup).

Table

Notes

References

Blackpool F.C.
Blackpool F.C. seasons